Carsia is a genus of moths in the family Geometridae erected by Jacob Hübner in 1825.

Species
 Carsia lythoxylata (Hübner, 1799)
 Carsia perpetuata (Lederer, 1870)
 Carsia sororiata (Hübner, 1813) – Manchester treble-bar

References

Chesiadini
Moth genera